Kumanoa is a genus of red algae belonging to the family Batrachospermaceae.

The genus has cosmopolitan distribution.

Species

There are several species, including:

Kumanoa abilii 
Kumanoa amazonensis 
Kumanoa ambigua

References

Batrachospermales
Red algae genera